Television Pool of Thailand is an organization established by THAI TV Channel 3, Royal Thai Army (RTA) Radio and Television Channel 5), BBTV Channel 7 and 9 MCOT HD on 20 December 1968 to collaborate on live coverage of special events such as royal events, governmental events and addresses and sport games such as Olympic Games, Asian Games, SEA Games, and FIFA World Cup.

Channels broadcasting under the TPT brand
Channel 3 HD
TV5 HD and Thai TV Global Network
Channel 7 HD
MCOT HD

In cooperation with:
NBT and NBT World
Thai PBS and ALTV

References 

1968 establishments in Thailand
Mass media companies established in 1968
Joint ventures
 Television organizations
Television in Thailand